Siedlec  is a village in the administrative district of Gmina Łęczyca, within Łęczyca County, Łódź Voivodeship, in central Poland.

The village has a population of 450.

References

Villages in Łęczyca County